Camp Las Pulgas also called 43 Area Camp Pendleton is subcamp of Camp Pendleton, California. The camp was built during World War 2. The camp was used for training US Marines before departing to the Pacific War. It also housed them after returning from the war. The camp had a mix of both tents and quonset huts. Las Pulgas is Spanish for The Fleas. The World War 2, Korean War and Vietnam War tent camp was called Camp Las Pulgas Bivouac Area and Tent Camp 1, this Area is now the parking lot for Camp Pendleton's Combat Convoy Simulator and the Training Support Division. In 1971 the camp became the home of the 11th Marine Regiment. The 11th Marine Regiment is the artillery division of the 1st Marine Division. The camp is also home to the 1st Maintenance Battalion. Also at Camp Las Pulgas - 43 Area is: Pulgas Lake, Las Pulgas Park, 11th Marine Armory, 43 Area Dental Clinic, Las Pulgas Barber Shop, 43 Area Fitness Center, 43 Area Pool, 43 Area Branch Medical Clinic, 43 Area SMP Single Marine Program Recreation Center, 43 Area Training Tank, United States Postal Office,   

Gaspar de Portolá's expedition with Junípero Serra and Joan Crespí camped at the spot in 1769. Father Crespí named the place La Canada de los Rosales or Rose Canyon, after seeing the wild Castilian roses that grew in the canyon. A few years later a Mission San Luis Rey de Francia survey party camped at the canyon and found and were hurt by many fleas, thus Camp Las Pulgas. The area became part of the vast California Spanish missions. With the Mexican secularization act of 1833 then land became grazing land for Andrés Pico and Pío Pico. In 1844 this became their land, Rancho Santa Margarita y Las Flores. Andrés Pico used the land as his headquarters in the Mexican–American War. His troops went on to fight in the Battle of San Pasqual in December 1846. Ater the war the land returned to grazing again. World War 2 turned the land into the training camp it is today.

See also

California during World War II
American Theater (1939–1945)
United States home front during World War II

References

External links
Fackbook 43 Area Camp Pendleton
 Camp Pendleton (official site)
 Camp Pendleton (GlobalSecurity.org)
 Marine Corps Community Services at Camp Pendleton

California in World War II
1942 establishments in California
Pendleton
Military facilities in San Diego County, California
Military installations in California